Lasiopetalum quinquenervium is a species of flowering plant in the family Malvaceae and is endemic to the south of Western Australia. It is an erect, spreading shrub with hairy stems and leaves, egg-shaped leaves and pink or white flowers.

Description
Flowering occurs from August to December.

Taxonomy
Lasiopetalum quinquenervium was first formally described in 1852 by Nikolai Turczaninow in Bulletin de la Société Impériale des Naturalistes de Moscou from specimens collected by James Drummond.
The specific epithet (quinquenervium) means "five-veined", referring to the leaves.

Distribution and habitat
This lasiopetalum grows in rocky places on hillsides and in coastal areas between Jerramungup, Ravensthorpe and Esperance in the Esperance Plains and Mallee biogeographic regions of southern Western Australia.

Conservation status
Lasiopetalum quinquenervium is listed as "not threatened" by the Western Australian Government Department of Biodiversity, Conservation and Attractions.

References

quinquenervium
Malvales of Australia
Flora of Western Australia
Plants described in 1852
Taxa named by Nikolai Turczaninow